Auden's Col is a high altitude mountain pass connecting Rudugaira valley and Bhilangna valley in India. It is situated at  elevation and connects the ridge coming from Gangotri III (6580 m) peak on the north-west and the ridge coming from Jogin I (6465 m) on the east, and also binds a glacier coming from Jogin I on the north side of Rudugaira valley, and deadly Khatling glacier on the south side of Bhilangna valley.

Rudra ganga stream or Rudragairu (gairu means deep) or Rudugaira gad drains Rudugaira glacier and eventually flows into Bhagirathi (Ganga) river near Gangotri, and Bhilangna river originates from Khatling glacier and meets Bhagirathi near Old Tehri.

History 
The pass is named after John Bicknell Auden of the Geological Survey of India, who first discovered it in 1935 and crossed it in 1939. Mr Harish Kapadia and Mr Romesh Bhattacharjee from the Himalayan Club repeated Auden's explorations in the late eighties.

Trekking 
Auden's Col is arguably one of the most dangerous passes in Garhwal Himalaya as the pass and the Khatling glacier are heavily infested with crevasses. Also, by crossing Auden's Col and then Mayali Pass, one can trek from Gangotri to Kedarnath, both among holiest Hindu temples.

References

External links 
 Auden's Col location in Wikimapia

Mountain passes of the Himalayas
Mountain passes of Uttarakhand
Geography of Uttarkashi district
Hiking trails in Uttarakhand